Little White Lies is a 2010 French comedy-drama film written and directed by Guillaume Canet, starring an ensemble cast of François Cluzet, Marion Cotillard, Benoît Magimel, Gilles Lellouche, Jean Dujardin, Laurent Lafitte, Valérie Bonneton and Pascale Arbillot. The original French title is Les Petits Mouchoirs, which means "the small handkerchiefs". The film was released in France on 20 October 2010. A sequel, Nous finirons ensemble (Little White Lies 2) was released in 2019 and features a surprise and unwanted visit of the group to Max's house, which he is trying to sell, for his birthday.

Plot
On leaving a Paris nightclub late at night, Ludo (Jean Dujardin) rides away on his scooter and is broadsided by a speeding truck that ran a red light. Lying between life and death in the hospital, Ludo is visited by his band of longtime friends, who decide that the gruesome crash should not prevent them from embarking on their summer holidays.

Prior to the trip, another major problem arises when one of the friends, osteopath Vincent (Benoît Magimel), confesses his attraction to restaurateur Max (François Cluzet). Both are married, and Max clearly is not interested, so when they arrive later with their families at his seaside cottage, tension is high. The group's stress level is further increased by pot-smoking rebel Marie (Marion Cotillard), lovesick actor Eric (Gilles Lellouche) and the even more lovesick Antoine (Laurent Lafitte), all of whom are suffering from failed or failing relationships.

Cast
 François Cluzet as Max Cantara
 Marion Cotillard as Marie
 Benoît Magimel as Vincent Ribaud
 Gilles Lellouche as Eric
 Jean Dujardin as Ludo
 Laurent Lafitte as Antoine
 Valérie Bonneton as Véronique Cantara
 Pascale Arbillot as Isabelle Ribaud
 Louise Monot as Lea
 Anne Marivin as Juliette
 Joël Dupuch as Jean-Louis 
 Hocine Mérabet as Nassim
 Maxim Nucci as Franck
 Paula Garcia as Paola

Production
The script took five months to write. The cast lived for three days in May at the house which would be used as a principal filming location, so it would feel familiar to them when they returned in the summer. The film began production in August 2009 and ended in October. The shooting took place in Paris and Cap Ferret.

Title
The French title Les Petits Mouchoirs refers to a French expression mettre dans sa poche avec son mouchoir par-dessus, which means "to put something in your pocket with your handkerchief on top of it", in other words, to keep something hidden, try to forget about it, not want to think about it.

Release
The film premiered at the 2010 Toronto International Film Festival. It was released in France on 20 October 2010 through EuropaCorp Distribution, who launched it on over 550 screens.

Reception

The film received mixed reviews. 

Roger Ebert gave the film three and a half stars out of four, remarking, "The American film that comes to mind is The Big Chill [...] It is the oyster fisherman who finally regards them all and presents the plain-spoken truth. What he says was waiting for someone to say. Joel Dupuch says it so well I hope he acts again. He has the presence. There are times when Little White Lies seems to meander, until we realize it knows exactly where it is going."

The film was panned by Philippe Azoury of Libération, who thought it was too long, strangely cast, and that all of its female characters were stereotypes. Le Parisien's Marie Sauvion was more ambivalent and divided the review in a pros and a cons section. The pros were that she found the genre in itself sympathetic, and how the film manages to use individual scenes to give the viewer a feeling of participation and shared enjoyment. On the negative side, she thought it was too unsubtle and predictable, and uses too much music to intensify emotional scenes, "In case we didn't understand when to be moved?"
The film won London's Favourite French Film award in 2011.

Music 
The music in the film is mainly American with English lyrics.

References

External links
 
 

2010 films
2010s French-language films
2010 comedy-drama films
Films directed by Guillaume Canet
French comedy-drama films
EuropaCorp films
2010 LGBT-related films
LGBT-related comedy-drama films
French LGBT-related films
2010s French films